Suavemente is a 1998 album by Elvis Crespo. 

Suavemente may also refer to:

 "Suavemente" (Elvis Crespo song), 1998
 "Suavemente" (Soolking song), 2022
 Suavemente, a 1982 album and song by Crystal
 "Coast 2 Coast (Suavemente)", a 2001 song by Angie Martinez fom Up Close and Personal

See also 
 Suave (disambiguation)